Koluthunganallur is a village in the Udayarpalayam taluk of Ariyalur district, Tamil Nadu, India.

Demographics 

As per the 2001 census, Koluthunganallur had a total population of 582 with 291 males and 291 females.

References 

Villages in Ariyalur district